

References

National First Division seasons
South
2005–06 in South African soccer leagues